Porth Neigwl, also known in English as "Hell's Mouth", is a broad bay, about 3 miles (5 km) wide, on the south coast of the Llŷn Peninsula in North Wales.

The bay faces south-west and lies between the headlands of Mynydd Rhiw to the west and Mynydd Cilan to the east. These craggy headlands have cliffs descending to the sea, and Porth Neigwl is said to be like a broad open mouth in the relief of south Llŷn. The name "Hell's mouth" was given for that reason and because of its danger to sailors in times of storm, with great waves and a lack of shelter.

The long, straight beach stretches for about 4 miles (7 km) between the two headlands. Behind the beach are grassy dunes which form a notable sea-marsh. The River Soch briefly runs parallel to the shore before turning inland near Llanengan (the only nearby village) towards Abersoch.

There is a campground at Tai-morfa near Llanengan. The big waves make it a popular resort for surfing and sailboarding.

The area is a Site of Special Scientific Interest.

References

Beaches of Gwynedd
Sites of Special Scientific Interest in West Gwynedd